Monica Galetti (née Faafiti, born August 1975) is a Samoan-born New Zealand chef. She is a former judge on the BBC competitive cooking programme MasterChef: The Professionals and chef proprietor of Mere in London. She was senior sous-chef at Le Gavroche in London. As well as appearing as a judge on MasterChef: The Professionals from 2009 to 2021, she has presented Amazing Hotels: Life Beyond the Lobby with Giles Coren since 2017.

Early life 
Galetti was born in American Samoa, and was initially raised by two aunts in Upolu as her mother had moved to Auckland, New Zealand, for work. At the age of eight, Galetti moved from Samoa to Wellington, New Zealand, and lived there with her parents and five siblings. In the early 1990s she studied for a diploma in hospitality at the Central Institute of Technology, Upper Hutt.

Career 
After completing her studies, Galetti worked at Lower Hutt restaurant Timothy's. The owner sent her to cooking competitions in Australia, America and Europe, and she began to look for a position in London by sending her CV to top restaurateurs. The first offer she received was from Michel Roux Jr – a beginning position as first commis at his two-Michelin-starred restaurant Le Gavroche, well below her position in Wellington as chef de partie. She accepted the offer and moved to London in 1999. She worked rapidly through the sections of the kitchen and became senior sous-chef, a position she held until 2015. She was the first woman to hold such a senior position at the restaurant.

While working for Roux, she launched and was Head Chef of the restaurant Le Gavroche des Tropiques in Mauritius.

She was a judge on the BBC series MasterChef: The Professionals from 2009 to 2021 and has appeared as a presenter on other food-related television programmes. 

In 2017, along with her husband David, she opened a new restaurant in London called Mere. This was achieved with backing from Westbury Street Holdings chairman Alastair Storey.

Galetti serves as a UK Tourism Ambassador for Samoa. She appeared in the BBC’s radio programme Desert Island Discs on 31 January 2021.

In 2022, Galetti was named as one of the judges for the Platinum Pudding, a competition to create a pudding for Queen Elizabeth II to celebrate her Platinum Jubilee

Publications

Platinum Pudding Competition 
In January 2022 it was announced that Galetti would sit as a judge on The Platinum Pudding Competition, a nationwide baking competition launched on 10 January 2022 by Buckingham Palace, Fortnum & Mason and The Big Jubilee Lunch to find a new pudding dedicated to Queen Elizabeth II as part of the official Platinum Jubilee celebrations marking the 70th anniversary of the accession of Queen Elizabeth II.

Personal life
In 2004, Galetti married French-born sommelier David Galetti, the Head Sommelier at Le Gavroche. They have one daughter, born in 2006.

References

Living people
New Zealand chefs
New Zealand expatriates in England
Year of birth uncertain
Samoan emigrants to New Zealand
20th-century New Zealand people
21st-century New Zealand people
Women chefs
1975 births